Arba Minch City Football Club (Amharic: አርባምንጭ ከተማ), also known as Arba Minch Kenema, is a professional Ethiopian football club based in Arba Minch. They play in the Ethiopian Premier League, the top division of professional football in Ethiopia.

History 
Arba Minch was most recently promoted to the Premier League in 2011–12 season. After a relative smooth first three seasons in the top league, frequent changes in coaches and administrative problems led them to be struggles over the next 4 seasons. Arba Minch narrowly avoided relegation in  both the 2015–16 and 2016–17 seasons. 

Arba Minch signed manager Tsegaye K/Mariam to a two-year contract before the 2017–18 campaign. Only to later sack the manager just a couple months into his contract. After seven straight seasons in the top league Arba Minch was relegated from the Ethiopian Premier League after the 2017–18 season. They rejoined the top division for the 2021-22 season.

Players

First-team squad

Former Managers 
 Tsegay K/Mariam
 Alemayehu Abayeneh
 Paulos Tsegaye
 Eyob Maale
 Dawit Cairo (from Gamo Chencha FC)
 John habtualem (from Chencha FC)

Former players 
 Degu Debebe
 Mulalem Mesfin
 Abebaw Butaqo
 Bereket
 Endale Kebede
Mulualem Tilahun 
Temesgen Duba

References

External links
Team profile – soccerway.com
Arba Minch Kenema logo 

Football clubs in Ethiopia
Sport in the Southern Nations, Nationalities, and Peoples' Region